Chesterton Community Sports College is a coeducational secondary school and specialist sports college   located in the Chesterton area of Newcastle-under-Lyme, Staffordshire, England. Feeder schools include Chesterton Primary, Crackley Bank, churchfields primary and St. Chads's

In 2006 they introduced music and drama into the curriculum. The school also has a full-time music teacher and a full-time drama teacher.
CCSC has recently gained their best GCSE Results yet.

Previously a community school administered by Staffordshire County Council, in December 2013 Chesterton Community Sports College converted to academy status. The school is now sponsored by the Collective Vision Trust.

Lessons
All pupils have twelve lessons a day, which include: Maths, English, Science, PHSCE (which happens during form), PE, RMS, Geography, Art, Technology, History, Music and Computer Science.  From Year 9 on students take their options, which include: GCSE Dance, GCSE ICT, History and many more.

Resources 
The school has a library, hall stage and sports hall. There are also neo-culture technology rooms, a music room and a drama room. Students have their own personal tablet computers provided by the school from Year 9 onwards

References

External links
 Official School Website

Secondary schools in Staffordshire
Academies in Staffordshire